Larry is a masculine given name. It may also refer to:

 Cyclone Larry, a cyclone that caused extensive damage in Australia in 2006
 Tropical Storm Larry (2003), which struck Mexico
 Lionel Larry (born 1986), American sprinter
 Wendy Larry (born 1955), American college women's basketball coach
 Larry (1974 film), a TV film
Come Play, a 2020 film, adapted from a 2018 short film Larry
 Larry (cartoonist), English cartoonist
 Larry (cat), British cat
 Larry (footballer), Brazilian footballer
 Larry (rapper), French rapper

See also
 
 The Larry shorts, early animated work from Family Guy creator Seth MacFarlane
 Larry's River, Nova Scotia, Canada
 Larry's Creek, New Zealand, also known as the Awarau River
 Larrys Creek, Pennsylvania, United States